I Will Return is J. Tillman's second album. It was originally released personally in 2004. Later in 2005 it was re-released in limited edition of 150 copies through Keep Recordings. In 2007 it was again re-released together with Long May You Run, J. Tillman on Fargo Records as a double-CD.

Track listing

Personnel
 Cello – Phil Peterson
 French Horn – Josh Hoffman
 Mastered By – Tim Walsh
 Piano, Electric Guitar – Eric Fisher
 Recorded By, Mixed By – Eric Fisher
 Songwriter – J. Tillman
 Vocals [Uncredited], Guitar [Uncredited] – J. Tillman

References

External links
J. Tillman official website

2005 albums
Keep Recordings albums
Josh Tillman albums